Beori is a valley located in Upper Chitral District, Khyber Pakhtunkhwa, Pakistan.  It meets the Kunar River and there are three villages located in the valley, including Drosh.  It is located at  according to Henrik Liljegren, a linguist.  It is located at the Hindu Raj range from the southeast.  The Chitral River also meets the valley.

Demography 
The main language in Biori is the Palula language, spoken by the Palula people, which is also spoken in Ashret, but has died out in other places in Chitral, Dir, and Kohistan.  There are also some speakers of Kalasha-mun.

Villages 
These are the villages in Biori:

Mingal
Dhamaret
Bhiuri

References 

Geography of Khyber Pakhtunkhwa